Genom vatten och eld is a studio album from Swedish dansband Lotta & Anders Engbergs orkester, released in 1989. The album peaked at #48 at the Swedish album charts.

Track listing

Charts

References

1989 albums
Lotta & Anders Engbergs orkester albums